KazSat-3 (QazSat-3) is a telecommunications satellite which was launched 28 April 2014 at 04:25:00 UTC from Cosmodrome Baikonur in Kazakhstan. with a Proton-M launch vehicle.

KazSat-3 is designed for services of telecommunications, television broadcasting and high-speed Internet access in Kazakhstan and neighboring countries. The spacecraft is developed and produced under the contract with the Republican Center of Space Communication (RCSC) within the project of creating a republican national telecommunications and broadcasting space system.

See also 

 KazSat-1
 KazSat-2

References 

Communications satellites in geostationary orbit
2014 in Kazakhstan
Spacecraft launched in 2014
Satellites using the Ekspress bus
Satellites of Kazakhstan
Communications in Kazakhstan